Mwape may refer to:

As surname
 Davies Mwape, Zambian footballer
 Emmanuel Mwape, Zambian footballer 
 Kenny Mwape, Zambian footballer
 Lupando Mwape, Zambian politician

As given name
 Mwape Mialo, Congolese footballer
 Mwape Miti, Zambian footballer

Zambian surnames
Bemba-language surnames